Suri is the Persian noun for red rose and the adjective for red.  

In Persian, Suri is commonly used in reference to a celebration or a joyful gathering like a festivity. For example, the Persian holiday Chaharshanbe Suri literally translates to Red Wednesday. Chaharshanbe translates to the day "Wednesday", and Suri translates to the adjective red. Chaharshanbe Suri is held on the last Wednesday before the Persian New Year, also known as noruz. 

Suri is the surname for Suriname. A republic in northeastern South America, on the Atlantic; it became a self-governing colony of the Netherlands in 1954 and became fully independent in 1975. 

Official languages: Dutch; English is also widely spoken. 

Religion: Hindu, Christian, and Muslim. 

Currency: guilder. 

Capital: Paramaribo. 

Pop: 418000 (1998 est.)

Area: 163820 km2 (63251 sq. miles)

Used alone the word refers to the red-toned damasc rose, Rosa damascena, and is commonly used as a given name.
 Suri ( सुरी ) is an Indian name of Sanskrit origin which means " goddess ". It is a feminine name

References

Persian words and phrases